April 2011 tornado outbreak may refer to the following tornado outbreaks:

Derecho and tornado outbreak of April 4–5, 2011
Tornado outbreak of April 9–11, 2011
Tornado outbreak of April 14–16, 2011
Tornado outbreak sequence of April 19–24, 2011
2011 Super Outbreak (April 25–28)

See also
2011 outbreak (disambiguation)